Geoff Wragg (9 January 1930 – 15 September 2017) was a Thoroughbred horse trainer who trained champion horses such as Teenoso and Pentire. He was the son of former jockey and trainer Harry Wragg, from whom he took over the licence at Abington Place, Newmarket in 1983 upon his father's retirement. Wragg retired in 2008 after 25 years of training and sold Abington Place to Sheikh Mohammed bin Khalifa Al Maktoum the following spring. He relocated to Yorkshire, the birthplace of his late father, Harry Wragg. He died in 2017.

Racing family

Wragg's father, Harry, was an extremely successful jockey and trainer, and the pair would be renowned for being the first to trial electronic timing equipment on the gallops as well as weighing their horses. His riding career was littered with success, winning all five domestic Classics – almost repeating the feat as a trainer with only The Oaks eluding him (trained the runner-up in 1974, ironically with the future dam of Teenoso, Furioso). Harry retired in 1982, leaving Geoff to train Teenoso to Classic glory at Epsom the following June. Harry's brothers were jockeys Arthur jr and Sam. Geoff had two siblings: brother Peter was a successful bloodstock until his death in February 2004, and sister Susan was married to top jockey Manny Mercer until his untimely and tragic death in September 1959. Geoff's retirement in 2008 brought to an end a long and hugely successful association with the Wragg name in horse racing.

Classic success

Wragg enjoyed Classic success in his very first season as a trainer when Teenoso won The Derby under Lester Piggott in 1983. However, the closest Wragg would come to replicating Teenoso's win would be some 23 years later when the unconsidered 66/1 chance Dragon Dancer came within a short head of causing one of the biggest upsets in the race's history in a four-way go to the line, narrowly losing out to Sir Percy. Rather ironically, Wragg had trained the temperamental dam of the winner and both he and his father also trained several of the extended family, the most notable member being Teenoso. His 2001 contender, Asian Heights, well fancied after his last-to-first win in the Predominate Stakes at Goodwood, was cruelly robbed of his chance of running in the Classic after splitting a pastern with just over a week to go before the big race. He recovered to win at Group 3/Listed level, but injuries continued to blight him and his career somewhat fizzled out.

Away from the Derby, Wragg failed to win another classic in the UK, though his talented filly Marling landed the 1992 Irish 1000 Guineas at The Curragh. Red Glow was made favourite for the 1988 Epsom Derby, but the colt was a notoriously tricky hold up ride and found plenty of trouble in running before finishing well to take fourth behind Kahyasi. He never scaled the heights his impressive win in the Dante Stakes the previous month had promised.

Successes

Other notable horses to have been trained by Wragg include Arcadian Heights, Most Welcome, Owington, First Island, First Trump, Pentire, Island House, Cassandra Go, Asian Heights and 2006 Derby runner up Dragon Dancer. Wragg was noted as targeting meetings like Chester's May Meeting and Glorious Goodwood with a great deal of success, most notably in handicaps with unexposed, improving three-year-olds. He also had a great knack of getting the best out of the fillies he trained, most notably the top-class Marling, Coronation Stakes winners Balisada and Rebecca Sharp and also the smart Danceabout.

Pentire

Arguably, apart from Teenoso who won the Epsom Derby  in 1983 and returned after a stress fracture to win the Grand Prix de St.Cloud and to beat a star studded field in the King George VI and Queen Elizabeth Stakes  in 1984,  the best horse that Wragg trained in his career was the top-class middle distance colt Pentire who on the basis of his relatively ordinary two-year-old form was not considered for the 1995 Epsom Derby. However, the colt thrived as a three-year-old, winning three Derby trial races at Sandown, Chester and Goodwood, seemingly thriving for the additional winter and also the extra test of stamina in his second season.

Pentire subsequently finished half a length behind Lammtarra, winner of The Derby the previous, in the King George VI and Queen Elizabeth Stakes at Ascot in 1995 leading to further speculation that he would have challenged Lammtarra for the Epsom Derby had he turned up himself, particularly as jockey Michael Hills seemed to go too soon at Ascot on his mount who, as was widely recognised, possessed the greater turn of foot of the two colts. Wragg ran Pentire in the King Edward VII Stakes at Royal Ascot, which he won comfortably from future Ascot Gold Cup winner Classic Cliche and the horse was kept in training as a four-year-old, a decision that was justified when Pentire won the King George VI and Queen Elizabeth Stakes in 1996. He was subsequently sold to stand as a stallion in Japan, and enjoyed a good amount of success when subsequently standing in New Zealand. He died in November 2017.

Owners

Among his main band of owners were Anthony Oppenheimer, Far East businessman John Pearce and also Mollers Racing, formed after the deaths of brothers Eric and Ralph 'Budgie' Moller, who left behind a trust fund to keep their famous chocolate and gold silks in the game beyond their deaths. Mollers Racing's horses were purchased by bloodstock agent John Ferguson in the main, following the sale of its breeding establishment, White Lodge Stud, to Sheikh Mohammed. Notable purchases included First Island, Pentire and Swallow Flight.

Mollers Racing

Wragg's patient approach was richly rewarded with both Island House and Swallow Flight, neither horse showing anything other than useful form until their four-year-old careers. Swallow Flight ended his three-year-old rated 104 having progressed through the handicap ranks and into Listed company, but the son of Bluebird excelled in his third season as a four-year-old, winning Listed events at Windsor and Goodwood, with a third-place finish in the Group 2 Queen Anne Stakes sandwiched between those two successes. He would repeat his Listed success at Windsor the following season and finally made the breakthrough at pattern level when winning the Group 2 Attheraces Mile at Sandown in April 2002. His last appearance on a racecourse would be in July of that year, turning in a lacklustre performance to come home last of four in Scottish Classic at Ayr. He went on to stand as a stallion, enjoying very minor success.

Island House's progress was rather more gradual, still a maiden in the autumn of his three-year-old career but breaking his duck in a classified event at Pontefract in September 1999 and following up in a handicap at Ayr a month later. His four-year-old campaign saw continued progress, following a comeback success in a conditions event at Newmarket with back-to-back victories in Listed events at Goodwood and Kempton. He would go on to record a further five wins at that level, and, in April 2001, landed his one and only win at pattern level in the Group 3 Gordon Richards Stakes at Sandown. Following that victory, he was infamously denied another when jockey Darryll Holland eased up prematurely with the race in the bag in the Huxley Stakes at Chester, with favourite Adilabad collaring the son of Grand Lodge on the line and incurring Holland a 14-day suspension. He covered a small number of mares upon retirement.

Another standout performer was Autumn Glory, a son of Charnwood Forest who again didn't show his best until he was four. A rare debut winner for the stable at Leicester in May 2003, he would be seen just twice more that season with limited success. However, he burst onto the scene as a four-year-old with impressive wins in the Spring Mile at Doncaster and Hambleton Rated Stakes at York in the spring of 2004, and he went on to establish himself as a high-class performer thereafter – especially when conditions were on the softer side – going on to score three times at Group 3 level. His career was cut short by injury.

Ivy Creek was a son of Gulch who won the first two races of his career, and he was desperately unlucky to not maintain his unbeaten record in the 2006 Dee Stakes at Chester, short of room at a vital stage and only just failing to reel in Art Deco by a neck. He proved disappointing in the Hampton Court Stakes at Royal Ascot the following month when favourite, but went on to fulfil that early potential the following summer with a pair of victories at Listed level at Goodwood and Pontefract. He placed at Group 3 level soon after, but had his career cut tragically short when breaking his leg in the Listed Buckhound Stakes at Ascot in May of the following year.
 
The silks were still in use until 2013 despite Wragg's retirement, with near-neighbour and fellow trainer Chris Wall subsequently housing a small number of Moller horses including the reasonably useful middle distance staying handicapper Snow Hill. With the remaining horses sold in the autumn of that year, it is highly unlikely the famous chocolate and gold silks will be seen on a racecourse ever again with the necessary funds to prove competitive deemed unavailable.

Last winner
Wragg's last winner was Convallaria on 19 November 2008 at Kempton, the Cape Cross filly winning a low grade 0–55 handicap for one of Wragg's original owners Daphne Lilley. In fact, she would be his penultimate ever runner, with that honour, perhaps fittingly, falling to one of his old stalwarts in latter years, smart all-weather performer Grand Passion, though he could only manage a ninth-place finish in the Listed Churchill Stakes at Lingfield. He would go on to be trained by Chris Wall but never recaptured his top form and was retired in October 2009 after a spate of low-key efforts.

Death
Geoff Wragg died at Newmarket on 15 September 2017 at the age of 87.

Major wins
 Great Britain
 Ascot Gold Cup – (1) – Arcadian Heights (1994)
 Cheveley Park Stakes – (1) – Marling (1991)
 Child Stakes – (1) – Inchmurrin (1988)
 Cork and Orrery Stakes – (1) – Owington (1994)
 Coronation Stakes – (3) – Marling (1992), Rebecca Sharp (1997), Balisada (1999)
 Derby – (1) – Teenoso (1983)
 July Cup – (1) – Owington (1994)
 King George VI and Queen Elizabeth Stakes – (2) – Teenoso (1984), Pentire (1996)
 King's Stand Stakes – (1) – Cassandra Go (2001)
 Lockinge Stakes – (2) – Most Welcome (1989), First Island (1997)
 Middle Park Stakes – (1) – First Trump (1993)
 Nassau Stakes – (1) – Ela Romara (1988)
 Prince of Wales's Stakes – (1) – First Island (1996)
 Queen Anne Stakes – (1) – Nicolotte (1995)
 Sun Chariot Stakes – (2) – Braiswick (1989), Danceabout (2000)
 Sussex Stakes – (2) – Marling (1992), First Island (1996)

 Canada
 E. P. Taylor Stakes – (1) – Braiswick (1989)

 France
 Grand Prix de Saint-Cloud – (1) – Teenoso (1984)
 Prix d'Ispahan – (1) – Sasuru (1997)

 Hong Kong
 Hong Kong Cup – (1) – First Island (1996)

 Ireland
 Irish 1,000 Guineas – (1) – Marling (1992)
 Irish Champion Stakes – (1) – Pentire (1995)

 Italy
 Premio Vittorio di Capua – (1) – Nicolotte (1995)

References

 NTRA.com
 McGrath, J A. The Daily Telegraph Geoff Wragg retires with just one regret – failing to land the Oaks Found at https://www.telegraph.co.uk/sport/horseracing/2633950/Geoff-Wragg-retires-with-just-one-regret-failing-to-land-the-Oaks-Horse-Racing.html

1930 births
2017 deaths
British racehorse trainers
People from Newmarket, Suffolk